The Wilkin River is a river in the Otago region of New Zealand, flowing into Lake Wanaka. Makarora is a natural conserved place. It has a wide variety of natural features, from iced mountains to rivers and pristine rainforest. Local tourism offer helicopter and jet boat rides along the Wilkin River.

See also
List of rivers of New Zealand

References

Rivers of Otago
Rivers of New Zealand